The 1938 All-Pro Team consisted of American football players chosen by various selectors for the All-Pro team of the National Football League (NFL) for the 1938 NFL season. Teams were selected by, among others, the National Professional Football Writers Association (PFW), the United Press (UP), the International News Service (INS), Collyer's Eye (CE), and the New York Daily News (NYDN).

Players displayed in bold were consensus first-team selections. Four players were selected for the first team by all five selectors: New York Giants halfback Ed Danowski; Green Bay Packers fullback Clarke Hinkle; New York Giants tackle Ed Widseth; and Chicago Bears guard Dan Fortmann. Another two were selected for the first team by four selectors: Brooklyn Dodgers quarterback Ace Parker (PFW, UP, INS, NYDN); Pittsburgh Pirates halfback Byron White (PFW, UP, INS, CE); and Green Bay Packers end Don Hutson (PFW, UP, INS, NYDN). Five players were selected for the first team by three selectors: Chicago Cardinals end Gaynell Tinsley (PFW, INS, CE); Philadelphia Eagles end Bill Hewitt (UP, CE, NYDN); Chicago Bears tackle Joe Stydahar (UP, INS, NYDN); Green Bay Packers guard Russ Letlow (PFW, INS, CE); and New York Giants center Mel Hein (UP, INS, NYDN).

Team

References

All-Pro Teams
1938 National Football League season